Šluota (literally "broom") was a Lithuanian satire and humour magazine which was published, with hiatuses, from 1934 to 2004. Until 1990, it was published by the Communist Party of Lithuania and contained mainly Communist propaganda.  It was the only humour magazine in the Lithuanian SSR and it was popular and well received. According to research of Neringa Klumbytė, artists and writers attempted to subvert the Communist ideology using the Aesopian language in the 1970s and 1980s.

History

In 1934–1936, Šluota was published by the Lithuanian Communist Party. Since the party was outlawed in the interwar Lithuania, the publication was also illegal and appeared irregularly. The magazine was initiated by a group of students at the Kaunas Art School who maintained contacts with the Lithuanian Red Aid. The first issue had 16 pages and measured . A total of seven issues appeared during this period. 

In 1940–1941, during the first Soviet occupation of Lithuania, it was published by the Soviet Agitprop and later by the Tiesa ("Truth") publishing house. It is suggested that the long post-World War II hiatus was related to the death of its editor, who restored the magazine in 1940 and no one else had the energy to convince the Communist officials to restore it again. Until 1941, the magazine was published in Kaunas. 

In 1956–1990, Šluota was published by the publishers of the Central Committee of the Communist Party of the Lithuanian SSR in Vilnius. It was a popular, well-liked, and profitable 16-page magazine published every two weeks. After the restoration of the independence of Lithuania, it was published by the company Šluota in 1990–1998 and by the company Piketo projektai in 2000–2004. In 1995, it was reorganized as a monthly newspaper.

Content
The magazine published satirical, humorous writings, jokes and cartoons and caricatures on social, political, cultural and household topics. One or its recurring joke characters is Kindziulis. 

The title of the journal reflected its revolutionary origins. It symbolized the intent to sweep away bourgeoisie, capitalists, clerics, etc. in a communist revolution. Issues published in 1940–1941 made fun of various "enemies of the people" and representatives of the old regime of President Antanas Smetona, including speculators, landlords, intellectuals, and bureaucrats. It also pointed out common problems of everyday life (such as laziness, wastefulness, alcoholism) and celebrated the new regime and building the new socialist society.

Issues published after 1956 no longer focused on external enemies (i.e. bourgeoisie), but turned the satire inward and pointed out flaws of the Soviet society. The cast of characters now included drunk and procrastinating workers, Soviet bureaucrats, directors of factories and collective farms, but not party or government officials. Šluota received numerous letters from readers that complained or reported on various disapproved actions (such as alcoholism). In 1963, the office of correspondence received 2,234 letters, 230 of which were published. 

Šluota devoted a third to a half of its content to cartoons and other illustrations. In the 1970s and 1980s there were around sixty artists who contributed to the magazine on somewhat regular basis. The artists were not members of the Communist Party and generally avoided contributing political or anti-religious cartoons despite higher commissions. Since it was easier to be ambiguous in a cartoon than in written text, some cartoons could be interpreted as anti-Soviet. For example, a cartoon of a tank aiming at the white peace dove could be interpreted as depicting either an American or Soviet tank. An ambiguous image printed as the cover for Lenin's 100th anniversary resulted in the entire issue being destroyed. Neringa Klumbytė characterized such subversive actions as "neither an example of clear collaboration, nor of open resistance, but rather a close interaction with power through dialogue, negotiation, acceptance, and rejection".

Editors
Magazines editors were:
 1934–1935: 
 1936: Bronius Žekonis
 1940–1941: 
 1956–1985: 
 1985–1990: 
 1990: 
 1991–1998: 
 2000–2004: Jonas Lenkutis

See also
Krokodil – Soviet satirical magazine published in Russia

References

External links
Full-text archive from 1934–1936 and 1940–1941

Lithuanian humour
Defunct magazines published in Lithuania
1934 establishments in Lithuania
2004 disestablishments in Lithuania
Communism in Lithuania
Communist newspapers
Satirical magazines published in Europe